Heddesheim is a municipality in the district of Rhein-Neckar-Kreis, in Baden-Württemberg, Germany. It is situated 9 km east of Mannheim, and 7 km southwest of Weinheim.

References

Rhein-Neckar-Kreis